Thomas Adams may refer to:

Politicians
Thomas Adams (MP), Member of Parliament for Bedford
Sir Thomas Adams, 1st Baronet (1586–1667/68), Lord Mayor of London
Thomas Adams (politician) (1730–1788), Virginia delegate to the Continental Congress
Thomas Boylston Adams (1772–1832), son of US President John Adams
Thomas Boylston Adams (1910–1997), American writer, executive, and political candidate
Thomas Burton Adams Jr. (1917–2006), American politician in Florida
Thomas Adams (sheriff) (1804–1869), sheriff of Norfolk County, Massachusetts

Military
Thomas Adams (British Army officer) (c. 1730–1764), British Army major, noted for his defense of the British position in Bengal in 1763
Sir Thomas Adams, 6th Baronet (1738–1770), naval officer

Musicians
Thomas Adams (organist, born 1785) (1785–1858), English organist and composer
Thomas Adams (organist, born 1857) (1857–1918), English organist and composer

Writers and publishers
Thomas Adams (priest) (1583–1652), English priest and religious writer
Thomas Adams (publisher) (died 1620), English bookseller and publisher
Thomas Adams (writer) (c. 1633–1670), English religious writer

Educators
Thomas Sewall Adams (1873–1933), American economist and educator
Thomas R. Adams (1921–2008), US educational figure, librarian and professor at Brown University
Thomas Adams (classicist) (1884–1953), New Zealand professor of classical languages and cricketer

Other people
Thomas Adams (manufacturer and philanthropist) (1807–1873), English Nottingham lace manufacturer and philanthropist
Thomas Adams (chewing gum maker) (1818–1905), American businessman
Thomas Albert Smith Adams (1839–1888), American religious figure
Thomas Adams (architect) (1871–1940), Scottish-born English pioneer of urban planning
Thomas Adams (basketball) (born 1980), American basketball player
Thomas William Adams (1842–1919), New Zealand farmer, forester, churchman and educationalist

See also
Tom Adams (disambiguation)
Adams (surname)